ECNS may refer to:

 ecns.cn, the English-language website of the China News Service
 EEG and Clinical Neuroscience Society
 Executive Council of Nova Scotia

See also 
 ECN (disambiguation)